Get Up! (stylized as GET UP! ep)  is female duo Soulhead's first extended play. It was released on July 30, 2003, and contained four new songs. It also received a limited edition "analog version," which had been released two weeks prior on July 16, 2003. The single charted on Oricon at #28 for the daily ranking.

Only the title track made it to the corresponding album Braided.

Information
All of the songs on the EP were written by Soulhead and arranged by both Soulhead and Octopussy. The song is a dance track about being with family, even when times get tough. Shining Forever (stylized as SHINING FOREVER) is an R&B track about not forgetting someone even when they're gone and how the memories "shine forever."

Dance With Me (stylized as DANCE WITH ME) is a dance/R&B track while Tonight the Night (stylized as TONIGHT THE NIGHT) is a hip hop song about dressing how you want when you go out clubbing and not allowing anyone to sway your interests.

Track listing

CD: Regular Edition
Get Up!
Shining Forever
Dance With Me
Tonight the Night

12" Analog
Side A
Get Up!
Get Up! (Instrumental)
Get Up! (A Capella)
Side B
Shining Forever
Shining Forever (Instrumental)
Shining Forever (A Capella)
Side C
Dance With Me
Dance With Me (Instrumental)
Dance With Me (A Capella)
Side D
Tonight the Night
Tonight the Night (Instrumental)
Tonight the Night (A Capella)

Charts and sales

References

2003 EPs
Sony Music Entertainment Japan EPs